Willimansett may refer to:
 Willimansett, Chicopee, Massachusetts, a settlement in Chicopee, Massachusetts
 Willimansett Bridge, a bridge in Massachusetts crossing the Connecticut River

See also
 Nipmuc, the indigenous peoples from whose language this name derives, meaning "good berries place" or "place of red earth"